Richard Fromberg and Brad Pearce were the defending champions, but Pearce did not participate this year.  Fromberg partnered Jason Stoltenberg, losing in the semifinals.

Javier Sánchez and Todd Woodbridge won the title, defeating Andrés Gómez and Emilio Sánchez 3–6, 7–6, 7–6 in the final.

Seeds

  Javier Sánchez /  Todd Woodbridge (champions)
  Udo Riglewski /  Michael Stich (first round)
  Andrés Gómez /  Emilio Sánchez (final)
  Sergi Bruguera /  Tomás Carbonell (quarterfinals)

Draw

Draw

References
Draw

OTB Open
1991 ATP Tour
1991 in American tennis